Up, Up and Away is a 2000 Disney Channel Original Movie. The film is a comedy/adventure about a boy from a family of superheroes who, despite not having any super powers of his own, is called on to save the world.

Plot
The movie tells the story of Scott Marshall, the son of two great superheroes, Bronze Eagle and Warrior Woman. All of his family members are gifted with superpowers. His father, Bronze Eagle, has the powers of flight, superhuman strength, and invulnerability. His mother, Warrior Woman, has the power of superhuman strength and superior hand-to-hand combat skills. His brother, Silver Charge, is gifted with superhuman speed, electrical and magnetism manipulation. His little sister, Molly, who constantly shows off her powers, much to her family's annoyance, has x-ray vision, as well as heat vision. His grandfather, Edward is known as the "Steel Condor", and has the ability of superhuman strength, invulnerability and flight (though he flies slower than cars), and has an ongoing feud with Superman - his primary complaint is Superman's alias Man of Steel, which effectively makes Edward the Bird of Steel.

It is said that his grandmother, Doris, has the ability to shapeshift. Scott desperately wants powers of his own. 

Meanwhile, a group of activists known as the "Earth Protectors" have been giving out CDs about the environment to Scott's classmates. But while the creator of the program, Nina, wants to use the CDs to help educate people about the environment, her partner, Malcolm, sees the program as a means to brainwash the entire world into giving him whatever he wants.

He tries, at first, to brainwash a bank's staff into giving him all the money, when one of Malcolm's henchmen sneezes, the staff snaps out it. He then does the next best thing, by using the program to make the children steal their parents' money and give it to him, thinking that it's just that night's homework. Fortunately, Scott's sister uses her x-ray vision to discover the money in his backpack. He tries to tell his parents that he didn't know he had stolen the money, but they are still suspicious.

Malcolm continues to use the program for personal gain, by giving the kids chocolate cravings, making them all wear blue, etc. One day, after Scott is almost late for school due to being mesmerized by the software, Jim get suspicious about Earth Protectors and decides to take Adam with him to the bank so he can use his electrical powers to make the computer system bring back up the Earth Protectors program.

Unfortunately, he gets over-excited at the thought that he could finally help his parents save the day that he overloads the computer's power supply, frying the system, destroying any information that they might have been able to recover. Meanwhile, Scott pretends to have superhuman strength and the ability to fly, so as not to disappoint his parents, who would be unhappy to learn that their son is normal. But he lets the success go to his head, because once the Earth Protectors program is fully developed so it will work just as well on parents as it does on their children, Malcolm blows up their warehouse, with Nina inside.

Scott tries to save her, but they both almost end up getting killed, but are saved by his father, who was told by his grandfather, who discovered Scott's ruse, that he is not super powered. They are safe, but Scott drops his mask in the process. Malcolm later finds it and matches it to Scott. Malcolm then sends a super strong version of the program to Scott during school, and has him tell him everything, about his family.

Malcolm then sends a special version of the program to Scott's teacher, and tells her that she needs to give that disk to Scott. He also tells her that all the children's parents have to watch that night's lesson, with them. Scott almost brings the special disk home, but accidentally runs into a girl in his class, Amy, whom he secretly likes.

They end up mixing up the disks, and instead Amy's mother subconsciously robs a bank and goes to Earth Protectors' new warehouse. After tying her up, they use her as bait to lure Scott's parents and brother to the warehouse. Once there, they capture them with aluminium foil, a superhero's only weakness. Scott, along with Amy and his best friend, Randy head to the warehouse to save his family from being brainwashed by Malcolm into becoming super villains who will obey anything he says.

When they get there, they are helped by Nina, who has become disgusted by Malcolm's antics. Nina tries to replace the bad disk with one of the good disks, but is stopped by one of Malcolm's henchmen. Scott has literally less than a second to stop the machine from permanently reprogramming his family. He uses a soccer ball to smash the main computer, stopping it with only milliseconds to spare.

His family then easily defeats and captures the villains, and Silver Charge uses his powers to (literally) burn away their memories of the heroes' identities, by burning some of their brain cells. Also Amy admits she likes Scott and asks him to a dance, but Adam erases her memories of everything that happened. Scott manages to get his family to agree to let Randy keep his memories (as having a friend to talk to about his family would help relieve stress) and everything returns to normal for the family.

Amy doesn't seem to remember she liked Scott, and they go back to somewhat hating each other, although when it's time to pick a team captain for soccer she chooses Scott instead of herself, surprising him. He chooses her and they end up as co-captains, with Randy asking Scott about superpowers. Randy is left impressed that Green Hornet was one of Scott's guests at his birthday party.

Cast
 Michael J. Pagan as Scott Marshall / Warrior Eagle
 Robert Townsend as Jim Marshall / Bronze Eagle
 Alex Datcher as Judy Marshall / Warrior Woman
 Sherman Hemsley as Edward Marshall / Steel Condor
 Kasan Butcher as Adam Marshall / Silver Charge
 Arreale Davis as Molly Marshall
 Kevin Connolly as Malcolm
 Olivia Burnette as Nina
 Ty Olsson as Barker
 Chris Marquette as Randy
 Jamie Renée Smith as Amy
 Scott Owen as Reach
 Joan Pringle as Doris Marshall
 Nancy Sorel as Mrs. Rosen
 Benita Ha as Ms. Parker

Home Media 
The film is available to rent or purchase digitally on Amazon Prime Video, iTunes, YouTube, and Google Play.

The film is also available on the streaming service Disney+.

See also 
 Sky High
 Zoom
 The Incredibles
 My Hero Academia
 Encanto

External links 
 

2000 television films
2000 films
2000 comedy films
2000s children's comedy films
2000s superhero comedy films
Disney Channel Original Movie films
American children's comedy films
American comedy television films
American superhero films
Films directed by Robert Townsend
2000s American films